Simon Philip Yates (born 7 August 1992) is a British road and track racing cyclist who currently rides for UCI WorldTeam . His twin brother is Adam Yates, who is also a professional cyclist. He won the gold medal in the points race at the 2013 Track Cycling World Championships. Following a doping ban in 2016, he won the young rider classification in the 2017 Tour de France and the general classification in the 2018 Vuelta a España. Yates has also won multiple stages at each of cycling's three grand tours.

Career

Early career

The brothers took up cycling after their father John was injured in a collision with a car while riding. During John's recovery he took the twins to Manchester Velodrome to track sessions run by his cycling club, Bury Clarion, to keep in touch with the other members. Both brothers soon started riding on the road for Bury Clarion and on the track for Eastlands Velo.

At the age of 18, Yates was selected by British Cycling for its Olympic Academy programme. He was also selected for the England team for the 2010 Commonwealth Games in Delhi, where his room-mate was Chris Froome.

He won the gold medal in the points race at the 2013 UCI Track Cycling World Championships.

Yates made his breakthrough on the road in 2013 riding for the British national team. Along with brother Adam, he competed at the 2013 Tour de l'Avenir for the Great Britain national team, where Simon won the race's fifth stage, ahead of Adam. Simon added another stage victory the following day, and finished the race tenth overall.

He was then selected as part of the British national team to take part in the Tour of Britain. He competed well throughout the race and on stage six he took his biggest win to that point, on the summit finish at Haytor, sprinting clear of a nine-man group, which included Bradley Wiggins and Nairo Quintana. Yates finished third overall in the race, and was the best rider in the under-23 classification.

Orica–GreenEDGE/Mitchelton–Scott (2014–present)

2014

Yates along with his brother joined the Australian UCI World Tour team  in 2014. He finished 12th overall in one of his first World Tour races, the Tour of the Basque Country. Yates suffered a broken collarbone on Stage 3 of the Tour of Turkey. He recovered to take seventh overall and the young rider classification in the Tour of Slovenia in June. He was a surprise selection for the  team for the 2014 Tour de France, with only 5 days' notice, and was one of only 4 British riders to take to the Grand Depart startline in Leeds. Yates featured in two breakaways during his Grand Tour debut, before being withdrawn by his team on the second rest day.

2015
In April 2015 Yates finished fifth overall in the Tour of the Basque Country. Later that month he rode the Tour de Romandie and placed sixth overall. In June, Yates finished fifth overall in the Critérium du Dauphiné after finishing second behind Chris Froome on the final stage, a summit finish at Modane. By doing so Yates also won the white jersey as best young rider.

He was again selected for the Tour de France, this time alongside his brother Adam. Simon placed eighth on Stage 3, which finished on the Mur de Huy, and eleventh on Stage 20, the queen stage of the race finishing on Alpe d'Huez.

2016

In March, Yates finished seventh overall at Paris–Nice, however, in April it emerged that Yates had tested positive for the banned substance terbutaline in an in-competition test during the race. Yates was disqualified from the race and served a four-month doping ban during 2016; his team took full responsibility for this blaming an "administrative error". The ban meant Yates missed the Tour de France, where his brother Adam finished fourth overall and won the young rider classification.

Following the expiry of his doping suspension, he was named in the startlist for the Vuelta a España. In stage 6 Yates, seeing an opportunity, escaped from a breakaway group to win a solo stage victory – the first of the Yates brothers to take a Grand Tour stage victory.

2017

2017 saw Yates collect stage wins at two prestigious stage races, Paris–Nice and the Tour de Romandie. He placed second at the latter, his highest finish in a UCI World Tour stage-race at the time. He finished 7th overall at the Tour de France and won the young rider classification, matching the feat achieved by his twin brother a year prior.

2018: Grand Tour success
Yates confirmed his and the team's plans for him participating in the Giro d'Italia and the Vuelta a España. In March, Yates won Stage 7 of the Paris–Nice, a mountain top finish to Valdeblore La Colmiane, to take the overall race lead going into the final stage. As de la Cruz and Fraile contested stage honours, Soler finished third – acquiring four bonus seconds on the finish in addition to three gained at an earlier intermediate sprint – and with a 35-second gap to Yates and the remaining general classification contenders, it was enough to give Soler victory over Yates by four seconds. Later that month, Yates won stage 7 of the Volta a Catalunya after attacking multiple times on the -long final circuit through the Montjuïc Park; he finished fourth overall.

Yates placed seventh in the opening  individual time trial in Jerusalem, 20 seconds down on defending race winner Tom Dumoulin. On Stage 6 to Mount Etna, Yates took the race lead after finishing second behind teammate Chaves; Yates attacked from the group of favourites  from the summit and caught Chaves, who had been part of the day's breakaway, in sight of the line, but allowed Chaves to take the stage honours. The result meant Yates held the Maglia rosa over Dumoulin in second, and Chaves in third place. Yates extended his lead further on Stage 10, but teammate Chaves lost 25 minutes after being dropped on the first climb.

On Stage 14, Yates finished second behind Chris Froome on Monte Zoncolan. With six bonus seconds for finishing second, Yates extended his overall advantage over Dumoulin, whilst his gap over Froome was 3 minutes, 10 seconds. Yates pedaled to a solo win on stage 15 to Sappada, attacking with  remaining, increasing his lead over Dumoulin. After holding his lead through the  individual time trial held as stage 17, Yates cracked on the final climb to Prato Nevoso on stage 18, losing 28 seconds to all of his other general classification rivals. Stage 19 had been classified as the 'queen stage' of the race, with three focussed climbs in the latter half of the stage: the half paved-half gravel climb of the Colle delle Finestre, followed by the climb to Sestriere and the final uphill finish to Bardonecchia. Yates cracked on the lower slopes of the Finestre, before Froome launched a solo attack with  left of the stage. Froome's advantage grew throughout the second half of the stage, culminating in him taking a stage victory of more than three minutes and thereby also taking the overall race lead, 40 seconds ahead of Dumoulin. Yates lost over 38 minutes to Froome and dropped to 17th overall. He eventually finished the race 21st overall, 1 hour and 15 minutes behind the winner Froome.

After the Giro, Yates made his return to racing at the Prueba Villafranca de Ordizia, where he finished second behind team-mate Robert Power. He subsequently returned to WorldTour competition at the Tour de Pologne in August, where he won the race's closing stage with a solo attack and finished second overall behind Michał Kwiatkowski. Yates was 's team leader for the Vuelta a España, with support from his brother. Yates moved into third place on the general classification after stage 4, the first mountain stage, ten seconds behind leader Kwiatkowski. On the ninth stage, Yates took the leader's red jersey from Rudy Molard going into the first rest day. However he lost the lead on stage 12, when  elected not to close down a large breakaway, with the red jersey being taken by Jesús Herrada with Yates in second and Alejandro Valverde in third. The following day, Yates cut nearly two minutes from Herrada's lead, and he then took victory on the fourteenth stage, reclaiming the overall lead. He extended his lead during stages 16 (an individual time trial) and 19, and on the last mountain stage, Yates attacked his rivals on the penultimate climb, joining Miguel Ángel López and Nairo Quintana alongside Enric Mas at the head of the race. He eventually finishing third on the stage behind Mas and López, who moved up into second and third overall after Valverde and Steven Kruijswijk lost significant time. He went on to safely cross the finish line in Madrid to secure his overall victory.

2019
Yates previously considered time-trialling to be a weakness, and slowly improved since his junior years. He had improved in 2019, with his first win in the discipline coming on a hilly course at Paris–Nice. Yates returned to the Giro d'Italia aiming for the general classification. He entered the race, publicly stating that he considered himself as "the number one favourite" for the race. He started, showing superb form on the opening stage, an individual time-trial in Bologna, where he finished second behind Primož Roglič. Yates's hopes of the overall win looked all but over after a disastrous stage 9 time-trial that saw him lose over 3 minutes, dropping to 24th overall. He lost further time on stage 13 up to Serrù Lake. Despite a second-place finish on stage 19, he finished 8th overall and described it as heartbreaking.

He rode the Tour de France, in support of his brother's general classification ambition, but Simon was allowed a day off domestique duty, and won stage 12 into Bagnères-de-Bigorre in a 3 up sprint against Pello Bilbao and Gregor Mühlberger. Unfortunately for Adam, his general classification hopes faded after losing time on the individual time-trial and the climb to Col du Tourmalet. These general classification losses freed up Simon as the team refocused on stage wins, and he added another mountain stage win after a ferocious solo attack on stage 15, taking 's tally to 3 before the second rest day.

2020
In September 2020, Yates won the 2020 Tirreno–Adriatico beating Geraint Thomas and becoming the first British winner of the race. In the following month, Yates started the 2020 Giro d'Italia. However, he had to abandon the race before the start of stage 8, after he tested positive for COVID-19.

2021
In April 2021, Yates claimed his first event of the season by winning at the Tour of the Alps. He finished 58 seconds ahead of Spaniard Pello Bilbao and Russian Aleksandr Vlasov finishing third.

At the 2021 Giro d'Italia, Yates took victory atop the Alpe di Mera on Stage 19, beating overall leader Egan Bernal by 28 seconds. He would eventually finish third overall in Milan.

Doping ban
In April 2016 it emerged that Yates had tested positive for the banned substance terbutaline in an in-competition test during Paris–Nice the previous month, where he finished seventh overall. 's owner Gerry Ryan accused British Cycling of leaking the news of Yates's failed drug test to the press, and criticised the organisation for doing so. In a statement,  claimed full responsibility for the test result, saying that the team's doctor had failed to apply for a therapeutic use exemption for an asthma inhaler used by Yates which triggered the positive test. Subsequently, the international governing body UCI issued a statement indicating that Yates would not be provisionally suspended from competition due to the substance he had tested positive for.

On 17 June, the UCI decided to issue a four-month ban for the "presence and use of the specified prohibited substance terbutaline"  backdated from 12 March (the date the positive sample was collected), preventing Yates from competing at the 2016 Tour de France.

Major results

Road

2011
 1st Stage 6 Tour de l'Avenir
 1st Twinings Tour, Premier Calendar
 9th Overall Thüringen Rundfahrt der U23
2013
 1st  Road race, National Under-23 Championships
 1st  Overall Arden Challenge
1st Stage 4
 3rd Overall Tour of Britain
1st Stage 6
 3rd La Côte Picarde
 9th Overall An Post Rás
1st  Young rider classification
 10th Overall Tour de l'Avenir
1st Stages 5 & 6
 10th Overall Flèche du Sud
 10th Overall Thüringen Rundfahrt der U23
 10th Overall Czech Cycling Tour
2014
 1st  Mountains classification, Tour of Alberta
 3rd Road race, National Championships
 7th Overall Tour of Slovenia
1st  Young rider classification
2015
 5th Overall Critérium du Dauphiné
1st  Young rider classification
 5th Overall Tour of the Basque Country
 6th Overall Tour de Romandie
2016
 1st Prueba Villafranca de Ordizia
 2nd Circuito de Getxo
 4th Overall Vuelta a Burgos
 6th Overall Vuelta a España
1st Stage 6
 7th Overall Paris–Nice
 7th Clásica de San Sebastián
2017
 1st GP Miguel Induráin
 2nd Overall Tour de Romandie
1st Stage 4
 7th Overall Tour de France
1st  Young rider classification
 9th Overall Paris–Nice
1st Stage 6
2018
 1st UCI World Tour
 1st  Overall Vuelta a España
1st  Combination classification
1st Stage 14
 Giro d'Italia
1st Stages 9, 11 & 15
Held  after Stages 6–18
Held  after Stages 9–18
 2nd Overall Paris–Nice
1st Stage 7
 2nd Overall Tour de Pologne
1st Stage 7
 2nd Prueba Villafranca de Ordizia
 4th Overall Volta a Catalunya
1st Stage 7
2019
 Tour de France
1st Stages 12 & 15
 Vuelta a Andalucía
1st  Mountains classification
1st Stage 4
 1st Stage 5 (ITT) Paris–Nice
 8th Overall Giro d'Italia
2020
 1st  Overall Tirreno–Adriatico
1st Stage 5
 3rd Overall Tour de Pologne
 7th Overall Tour Down Under
 10th Cadel Evans Great Ocean Road Race
2021
 1st  Overall Tour of the Alps
1st Stage 2
 3rd Overall Giro d'Italia
1st Stage 19
 4th Overall CRO Race
1st  Mountains classification
 9th Overall Volta a Catalunya
 10th Overall Tirreno–Adriatico
2022
 1st  Overall Vuelta a Castilla y León
1st Stage 2
 1st Prueba Villafranca de Ordizia
 Giro d'Italia
1st Stages 2 (ITT) & 14
 Vuelta a Asturias
1st  Points classification
1st Stages 1 & 3
 2nd Overall Paris–Nice
1st Stage 8
 5th Overall Vuelta a Andalucía
 6th Clásica de San Sebastián
2023
 2nd Overall Tour Down Under
1st Stage 5
 4th Overall Paris–Nice

General classification results timeline

Classics results timeline

Track

2009
 3rd Madison (with Adam Yates), National Junior Championships
2010
 UCI World Junior Championships
1st  Madison (with Daniel McLay)
2nd  Team pursuit
 National Junior Championships
1st  Madison (with Adam Yates)
2nd Scratch race
2nd Points race
 National Championships
2nd Points race
2nd Scratch race
2011
 1st Six Days of Ghent Future Stars (with Owain Doull)
 2nd Omnium, National Championships
 3rd Team pursuit, UCI World Cup, Beijing
2012
 National Championships
1st  Madison (with Mark Christian)
1st  Omnium
1st  Team pursuit
2013
 1st  Points race, UCI World Championships

See also

 Adam Yates
 List of doping cases in cycling

References

External links

 
 
 
 
 
 
 
 

1992 births
British Giro d'Italia stage winners
British Tour de France stage winners
British Vuelta a España stage winners
British male cyclists
Commonwealth Games competitors for England
Cyclists at the 2010 Commonwealth Games
Cyclists at the 2020 Summer Olympics
Doping cases in cycling
English male cyclists
English sportspeople in doping cases
English track cyclists
Living people
Olympic cyclists of Great Britain
Sportspeople from Bury, Greater Manchester
English twins
Twin sportspeople
UCI Track Cycling World Champions (men)
UCI World Tour winners
Vuelta a España winners